The following list contains the 77 football clubs playing in the Icelandic football league system.

League clubs 2018

Úrvalsdeild

1. deild karla

2. deild karla

3. deild karla

4. deild karla 
Group A

Group B

Group C

Group D

References
Aðildarfélög um KSÍ (Member clubs of the KSÍ) at ksi.is (Icelandic Football Association)

Iceland
clubs
LIst
Football clubs